Dinorah Figuera (born 15 April 1961) is a Venezuelan doctor and politician. Current deputy and president of the IV National Assembly of Venezuela in exile in Spain.

Career
Born in Aragua, Dinorah Figuera was a student leader at the Central University of Venezuela where she graduated as a surgeon in 1991. As a member of Radical Cause party, she was undersecretary of the Libertador Municipality of Caracas between 1993 and 1996, during the administration of Aristóbulo Istúriz. She was a figure during the 2017 protests in Venezuela.

President of the National Assembly
Figuera was elected as a deputy for Caracas in the III National Assembly and for Aragua in the IV National Assembly. Figuera is exiled in Spain after escaping Venezuela through the French embassy in Caracas. 

On 5 January 2023, Figuera was elected as president of the IV National Assembly, even though she remains in exile. Figuera was chosen to replace opposition figure Juan Guaidó. After her election, the government of Venezuela issued an arrest warrant against her.

In an interview with Reuters, Figuera said that she was confident that the Biden administration will protect the assets of Citgo Petroleum and the nearly $2 billion in gold that the Venezuelan governments holds in the Bank of England and that has been a dispute between the Maduro government and the opposition.

References

1961 births
21st-century Venezuelan women politicians
Members of the National Assembly (Venezuela)
Speakers of the National Assembly (Venezuela)
Venezuelan women physicians
Central University of Venezuela alumni
Justice First politicians
Venezuelan exiles
Living people